Frederic "Fred" Winters (born September 25, 1982) is a Canadian professional volleyball player. He was part of the Canada national team at the 2014 FIVB World Championship in Poland.

In July 2016, Winters was named to Canada's 2016 Olympic team.

Honours

Club
Sada Cruzeiro
 Brazilian Superliga: 2014–15, 2015–16
 FIVB Club World Championship: 2015
Benfica
 Portuguese First Division: 2018–19
 Portuguese Cup: 2017–18, 2018–19
 Portuguese Super Cup: 2018

International
Canada
 Pan American Games: third place 2015

References

1982 births
Living people
Canadian men's volleyball players
Canadian expatriate sportspeople in Brazil
Canadian expatriate sportspeople in Portugal
Pan American Games bronze medalists for Canada
Pan American Games medalists in volleyball
Pepperdine Waves men's volleyball players
Sportspeople from Victoria, British Columbia
Volleyball players at the 2015 Pan American Games
Volleyball players at the 2016 Summer Olympics
S.L. Benfica volleyball players
Olympic volleyball players of Canada
Resovia (volleyball) players
Medalists at the 2015 Pan American Games